Mount Irau is a high mountain located at the border of Pahang and Perak states, Malaysia. Part of the Titiwangsa Mountains, Irau's  summit is 2110 metres (6922 feet), making it the highest mountain in the Cameron Highlands region, as well as the 15th highest mountain in Malaysia. Mossy forest and fairyland, cold wind and misty clouds; are some of the characteristics at Irau. One must hike about three hours to reach Irau from the base of the mountain.

It takes around 3-4 hours to reach the peak. Usually hiker will park their car at Cameron Square (Basement 2, Free parking) and they will take 4x4 to go to the starting point of Irau.

Irau